Daniel Alan Colman (born July 11, 1990) is an American professional poker player, originally from Holden, Massachusetts. He is best known for winning the $1,000,000 buy-in Big One for One Drop at the 2014 World Series of Poker. He beat Daniel Negreanu heads-up for a first place prize of $15,306,668, the fourth largest single payout in poker tournament history.

Poker career
Colman is primarily an online player under the names "mrGR33N13" and "riyyc225". In 2013 he became the first player in history to win $1,000,000 in hyper-turbo tournaments in a calendar year, accomplishing the feat in only 9 months. In April 2014 he won the €100,000 Super High Roller at the European Poker Tour Grand Final in Monte Carlo, earning €1,539,300.

At the 2014 WSOP, he finished in 3rd place in the $10,000 Heads-Up event, before winning The Big One for One Drop for $15,306,668.

Colman added two more seven-figure cashes that summer. First, he finished 2nd in the €50,000 Super High Roller at EPT 2014 for €843,066 ($1,120,186), then in September he won the Seminole Hard Rock Poker Open, prevailing over a field of 1,499 and winning $1,446,710. In October 2014 he won the WPT Alpha 8 super high roller for $990,000, bringing his live tournament cashes to 21 million in 2014.

In 2014, he won the BLUFF Player of the year award.

As of May 2021, his total live winnings exceed $28,900,000.

World Series of Poker Bracelets

Awards
 ALL IN Magazine 2014 Poker Player of the Year
 Card Player Magazine 2014 Player of the Year Award
 Bluff Magazine 2014 Player of the Year Award

References

External links
 WSOP profile
 CardPlayer.com profile

1990 births
American poker players
World Series of Poker bracelet winners
People from Holden, Massachusetts
American expatriates in Brazil
Living people
Sportspeople from Worcester County, Massachusetts